Haji Ghulam Mohammad Khan was an Indian politician, social worker and industrialist born on 30 December 1927 at village Mohammadganj, Moradabad district, Uttar Pradesh and was a member of 6th Lok Sabha, 7th Lok Sabha, 9th Lok Sabha and 10th Lok Sabha from Moradabad in Uttar Pradesh State, India.
His father converted to Islam He was a Rajput Muslim and shares good relations with his Hindu cousins and relatives.

References

1927 births
People from Moradabad district
India MPs 1980–1984
India MPs 1977–1979
India MPs 1989–1991
India MPs 1991–1996
Lok Sabha members from Uttar Pradesh
Possibly living people